Golan Levin (born 1972) is an American new media artist, composer, performer and engineer interested in developing artifacts and events which explore supple new modes of reactive expression.

Biography
Levin received a self-designed Bachelor's degree in Art and Design at the Massachusetts Institute of Technology in 1994, and a Master's degree in Media Arts and Sciences from the MIT Media Lab in 2000, as a student in John Maeda's Aesthetics and Computation Group (ACG). Between degrees, Levin worked as an interface designer at Paul Allen's Interval Research Corporation, where he was introduced to the field of interactive new media art by Michael Naimark, Brenda Laurel, and Scott Snibbe, among others. Levin was an Eyebeam resident in 2002 and 2003.

After his graduate work at MIT, Levin taught computational design in various schools in New York City, including Columbia University, Cooper Union, and Parsons School of Design before accepting a position at Carnegie Mellon University (CMU) in 2004. Levin is currently Associate Professor of Electronic Time Based Art in the CMU School of Art, with courtesy appointments in the CMU School of Computer Science, School of Design, School of Architecture, and Entertainment Technology Center. There he teaches computation arts and researches new intersections of machine code and visual culture. Since 2009, Levin has also held the position of Director of the Frank-Ratchye STUDIO for Creative Inquiry at CMU, an interdisciplinary research unit dedicated to supporting projects at the intersection of arts and technology.

Work 

Golan Levin's artwork focuses on the design of systems for the creation, manipulation and performance of simultaneous image and sound, as part of a more general inquiry into formal languages of interactivity and of nonverbal communication in cybernetic systems. Through performances, digital artifacts, and virtual environments, often created with a variety of collaborators, Levin applies creative twists to digital technologies that highlight our relationship with machines, make visible our ways of interacting with each other, and explore the intersection of abstract communication and interactivity. From 2002–2007, Levin and Zachary Lieberman collaborated on a variety of projects together, using the name Tmema to represent their collective work.

Levin's projects include the Free Universal Construction Kit (2012), a collection of 3D-printable adapters for popular toy construction systems, developed in collaboration with R. Shawn Sims, which is included in the permanent collection of the Museum of Modern Art. Levin also led collaborations to develop Terrapattern (2016), an open-ended tool to support visual query-by-example in satellite imagery, and Augmented Hand Series (2014), a real-time interactive software system that presents playful, dreamlike, and uncanny transformations of its visitors’ hands.

Levin has exhibited, performed, and lectured widely in Europe, America and Asia. His work has been shown at the New Museum of Contemporary Art, The Kitchen, the Neuberger Museum, and The Whitney Biennial, all in New York City; Ars Electronica in Linz, Austria; The Museum of Contemporary Art in Taipei, Taiwan; The NTT InterCommunication Center in Tokyo, Japan; the Zentrum für Kunst und Medientechnologie in Karlsruhe, Germany; and MoMA, among other venues. His funding credits include grants from Creative Capital, The New York State Council on the Arts, the Pennsylvania Council on the Arts, the Rockefeller MAP Fund, The Greenwall Foundation, the Langlois Foundation, Turbulence.org, and the Arts Council England.

Projects

Levin's work combines equal measures of the whimsical, the provocative, and the sublime in a wide variety of online, installation and performance media.
 Audiovisual Environment Suite (2000), a set of five interactive systems which allow people to create and perform abstract animation and synthetic sound in real time. It was granted an Award of Distinction in the Prix Ars Electronica (Interactive Art category).
 Scribble (2000), features tightly-coupled sounds and dynamic visuals which are at times carefully scored, and at other times loosely improvised. Scribble has been presented in duo and trio formats at global festivals and venues. It is the Audiovisual Environment Suite's accompanying audiovisual performance.
 The Secret Lives of Numbers (2002), an interactive information visualization about the "popularity" of numbers on the World Wide Web, granted an Award of Distinction in the Prix Ars Electronica (Net Art category). Commissioned by Turbulence.org.
 Dialtones: A Telesymphony (2001), a concert whose sounds are wholly performed through the carefully choreographed dialing and ringing of the audience's own mobile phones.
 The Alphabet Synthesis Machine (2002), a genetic algorithm that generates imaginary writing systems. Developed in collaboration with Cassidy Curtis and Johnathan Feinberg.
 Re:MARK (2002), an installation for two participants which presents an interactive visualization of speech, using sounds spoken into a pair of microphones are analyzed and classified by a phoneme recognition system.
 Messa di Voce (2003), installation piece using graphics interacting with sound. It was developed in collaboration with Zachary Lieberman.
 The Manual Input Sessions (2004), a series of audiovisual vignettes which probe the expressive possibilities of hand gestures and finger movements. It was developed in collaboration with Zachary Lieberman.
 Scrapple (2005)
 Ursonography (2005), developed in collaboration with Jaap Blonk
 The Dumpster (2006) interactive information visualization.
 Eyecode (2007) installation that reflects the viewer's gaze
 Opto-Isolator (2007) interactive sculpture that looks back at the viewer with a single embedded moving eye.
 Rectified flowers (2010) uses a polar-coordinates transform to create "landscapes" from images of flowers.
 Augmented Hand Series (2014) real-time interactive software system that presents playful, dreamlike, and uncanny transformations of its visitors' hands

Levin's most recent work centers around interactive robotics, machine vision, and the theme of gaze as a primary new mode for human-machine communication.

Levin also did a Ted Talk discussing technology as art.

References

Further reading 
 Bruce Wands, Art of the Digital Age, Thames & Hudson, 2006. .
 Mark Tribe and Reena Jana, New Media Art, Taschen, 2006. .
 Joline Blais and Jon Ippolito, At the Edge of Art, Thames & Hudson. .
 Wolf Lieser. Digital Art. Langenscheidt: h.f. ullmann. 2009.

External links 

 Levin's website
 Article on The Dumpster by Lev Manovich
 Artdaily.org article on Messa di Voce
 New York Times review of Rhizome ArtBase 101
 
 "Software (as) art" (TED2004)
 "Art that looks back at you" (TED2009)
 Art && Code 3D

1972 births
Living people
Carnegie Mellon University faculty
American digital artists
Massachusetts Institute of Technology alumni
Modern artists